is a passenger railway station located in Kōnan-ku, Yokohama, Kanagawa Prefecture, Japan, operated by the East Japan Railway Company (JR East).

Lines

Station layout 
The station consists of one island platform serving two tracks. The platform is connected to the station building by a footbridge. The station has a "Midori no Madoguchi" staffed ticket office.

Platforms

History
The area around Kōnandai Station was controlled by the American military in the post-war era. The property was returned to the Japanese government by 1965 and developed into a housing district. The Japan National Railways (JNR) Keihin-Tōhoku Line was extended from its former terminus at Yōkōdai Station through to Ōfuna Station in 1973, and Kōnandai Station was opened on 9 April 1973. The station came under the management of JR East on April 1, 1987 after the privatization of the JNR.

Passenger statistics
In fiscal 2019, the station was used by an average of 31,683 passengers daily (boarding passengers only).

The passenger figures (boarding passengers only) for previous years are as shown below.

Surrounding area
 Konandai 214 Building
Onshi Foundation Saiseikai Yokohama Nanbu Hospital
 Konandai Hospital

See also
 List of railway stations in Japan

References

External links

 

Railway stations in Kanagawa Prefecture
Railway stations in Japan opened in 1973
Keihin-Tōhoku Line
Negishi Line
Railway stations in Yokohama